M. Shamshul Haque was an academic from Bangladesh who was the 19th Vice Chancellor of Dhaka University and an advisor to the Caretaker government of Bangladesh in 1996.

Career 
Haque was the 19th Vice Chancellor of Dhaka University. He was an advisor to the caretaker government's Ministry of Education, Youth and Sports and Culture from 3 April 1996 to 23 June 1996.

References 

Date of birth missing
Year of death missing
Year of birth missing
Vice-Chancellors of the University of Dhaka
Advisors of Caretaker Government of Bangladesh